General Sir Tomkyns Hilgrove Turner  KC  (12 January 1764 – 6 May 1843), known as Sir Hilgrove Turner, is best known as the officer who escorted the Rosetta Stone from Egypt to England.

Military career
Turner was commissioned as an Ensign on the 20th of February, 1782, into the Third Regiment of Foot Guards. In 1792 he was a Lieutenant and Captain. Turner and the Stone were on board the recently captured French ship HMS Egyptienne when it made its way to England in September, 1801. He claimed that he had personally seized the Stone from General Jacques-François Menou and carried it away on a gun carriage. He also asserted that when the French learned of his intentions, that they removed the packaging for the Stone and that "it was thrown upon its face". There are other versions of how the English forces captured the Stone from the French, so it is unknown how reliable his account is. He was elected a Fellow of the Royal Society in December 1804.

In 1801 he was made Colonel, in 1808 Major-General. He became Colonel of the 19th (or The 1st Yorkshire North Riding) Regiment of Foot on 27 April, 1811 (his rank in the regiment being different from his rank in the army). From 1812 to 1830 he held the post of Groom of the Bedchamber to George IV (including the period when the latter acted as Prince Regent during his father's mental illness). He would later become Lieutenant Governor of Jersey from 1814 to 1816 and Governor and military Commander-in-chief of Bermuda, which was elevated to an Imperial fortress in the aftermath of the independence of the colonies that became the United States of America, from 1826 to 1832, and in 1827 became a Knight Grand Cross of the Royal Guelphic Order.

Personal life
Turner was the son of Richard Turner, a surgeon in Uxbridge, Middlesex and his wife Magdalen Hilgrove, a native of Jersey. In 1839 his daughter Charlotte Esther Turner married Henry Octavius Coxe, Bodleian librarian. Coxe's predecessor Bulkeley Bandinel was Tomkyns Turner's second cousin. Some years after his death Turner's children were involved in a lawsuit over the legacies left them in the wills of some Hilgrove kinsmen.

References

External links

|-

1764 births
1843 deaths
Fellows of the Royal Society
Governors of Bermuda
British Army generals
Governors of Jersey
British Army personnel of the Napoleonic Wars
Scots Guards officers
Military personnel from Middlesex
Knights of the Order of the Crescent
Recipients of the Order of St. Anna
People from Uxbridge